The D.I.C.E. Award for Mobile Game of the Year is an award presented annually by the Academy of Interactive Arts & Sciences during the academy's annual D.I.C.E. Awards. This award recognizes a game "for a mobile device platform such as a mobile phone or tablet. These games demonstrate a skilled usage of the device's software and hardware features to offer a unique and addictive play experience. All game genres are eligible. Mobile platforms include, but are not limited to iOS or Android."

The most recent winner is Marvel Snap, developed by Second Dinner and published by Nuverse.

History 
The first award that was offered for phones was Wireless Game of the Year which recognized a "game developed for a wireless phone or handset that demonstrates the greatest achievement in overall game design, play and/or breakthrough in wireless gaming." However, the only nominees for the award at the 2005 Awards were games for Nintendo handheld devices. Since there is already a Handheld Game of the Year, Wireless Game of the Year would be replaced with Cellular Game of the Year in 2006. It was changed to Mobile Game of the Year in 2007, but was reverted back to Cellular Game of the Year in 2008. The 2010 Awards offered Portable Game of the Year which recognized a "developed for a portable platform" that included either gaming handhelds or other mobile devices. The academy then began offering separate awards for Handheld Game of the Year and Mobile Game of the Year again in 2012. The awards would be combined into Portable Game of the Year again in 2019 and 2020, and would ultimately be replaced with Mobile Game of the Year in 2021. 
Wireless Game of the Year (2005)
Cellular Game of the Year (2006, 2008, 2009)
Mobile Game of the Year (2007, 2012–2018, 2021–present)
Portable Game of the Year (2010, 2011, 2019, 2020)

Winners and nominees

2000s

2010s

2020s

Multiple nominations and wins

Developers and publishers 
Nintendo has published the most nominees. Most of them were made for their handheld devices, with the exception of Fire Emblem Heroes and Dragalia Lost. Level-5 has developed the most nominees. All were released for Nintendo DS. Electronic Arts has published the most winners, and is one of two publishers to publish consecutive winners. The only other publisher with back-to-back wins is Annapurna Interactive. Nokia published the most nominees without publishing a single winner.

Franchises 
The Pokémon franchise has the most nominations and wins. One of which has a Nintendo handheld. Both nominations for the Mario and Professor Layton franchises were with Nintendo handheld devices. Infinity Blade and Monument Valley. Infinity Ward and Monument Valley had both nominations on mobile devices.

Notes

References 

D.I.C.E. Awards
Awards established in 2005